Fábio Rogério Barbosa Câmara (born September 24, 1972, in São Luís) is a Brazilian politician. He was alderman of São Luís and candidate for mayor of São Luís.

References 

Living people
Brazilian Democratic Movement politicians
1972 births